The Test de français international (TFI) is a language proficiency test for non-native speakers of French. It is administered by the Educational Testing Service (ETS).

Format of TFI exam
 is standardized
 is multiple choice
 contains 180 questions divided into two sections: listening and reading
 is composed of six parts (specific instructions are in French)
 lasts approximately 2.5 hours (including time for administrative procedures)
 measures French proficiency on a single, continuous scale

External links
 ETS's Canada TFI page
 Description of the TFI™ Test

French language tests